SOJA – Live in Hawaii is a DVD recorded between January 9 and January 20, 2008, by reggae band SOJA in Oahu, Maui, and Kailua-Kona.  It was directed and produced by Marc Carlini and was released on January 8, 2009.

Track listing
 Sorry
 Revolution
 Be Aware
 You Don't Know Me
 By My Side
 Stars and Stripes
 Rasta Courage
 To Whom It May Concern
 Peace In A Time Of War
 Open My Eyes
 Faith Works
 Bleed Through
 Can't Tell Me
 True Love
 911

Personnel

References

External links
 SOJA - Live in Hawaii DVD
 SOJA: Live in Hawaii on Yahoo! Movies

SOJA albums
Reggae video albums
2009 video albums